The 2006 Watsons Water Champions Challenge is a women's exhibition (no points for the world ranking can be earned) tennis tournament organized at the beginning of each season.

Players
 Lindsay Davenport (1)
 Kim Clijsters (2)
 Elena Dementieva (3)
 Venus Williams (4)
 Serena Williams
 Nicole Vaidišová
 Sania Mirza 
 Zheng Jie

Results

Golden Group (Main Draw)

Silver Group (Losers Bracket)

External links
Official website

Watsons Water Champions Challenge
Champions Challenge
Tennis tournaments in Hong Kong
2006 in Hong Kong sport
2006 in Chinese tennis
2006 in Hong Kong women's sport